Petrolisthes laevigatus is a species of porcelain crab found in Chile and Peru. Its carapace width is up to 2.5 cm. P. laevigatus lives under rocks in the middle and lower intertidal area. It feeds by filtering zooplankton.

References

Porcelain crabs
Crustaceans of the eastern Pacific Ocean
Crustaceans described in 1835
Taxa named by Félix Édouard Guérin-Méneville